Henry Edmund Olufemi Adefope  (15 March 1926 – 11 March 2012) was a Nigerian Army major general who served as Minister of Foreign Affairs and as a member of the International Olympic Committee from 1985 to 2006 and an honorary member of the International Olympic Committee since 2007.

Early life and education
Henry Adefope was born on 15 March 1926 in Kaduna, Nigeria to Alice Adefope and Chief Adefope. He was educated at CMS Grammar School, Lagos and Glasgow University, graduating in General medicine in 1952.  He worked as a doctor from 1953 to 1963 and was then commissioned into the Nigerian Army in 1963.

Career
He rose to the rank of Major General and served as Director of Medical Services.

Adefope also served in a variety of positions in sports administration, including terms as the President of the Nigerian Olympic Committee from 1967 to 1976 and as Vice-President of the Commonwealth Games Federation from 1974 to 1982. In 1985 he was elected to the IOC. While with the IOC, he has been a member of the commissions that selected the host cities for the 2000 and 2004 Summer Olympic Games.  He was investigated, but exonerated in regards to the 2002 Winter Olympic bid scandal. He became an IOC Honorary Member in 2006.

Family
Adefope was a father, grandfather and great-grandfather. His children include Femi Adefope, Dotun Okojie, Folake Nedd, Ronke Eso, Seyi Adefope, Niyi Adefope and Toyin Adeyeye.

Death
Henry Adefope died on 11 March 2012 at the age of 85, four days shy of his 86th birthday.

References

External links
 IOC member profile

1926 births
2012 deaths
Nigerian generals
Yoruba physicians
Yoruba politicians
CMS Grammar School, Lagos alumni
People from Kaduna
Alumni of the University of Glasgow
Nigerian military doctors
Foreign ministers of Nigeria
International Olympic Committee members